"Ordinary Pleasure" is a song recorded by American singer-songwriter Toro y Moi. The song was released on December 4, 2018, by Carpark Records, as the second single from his sixth studio album Outer Peace (2019). Toro y Moi is the recording project of musician Chaz Bundick, who wrote, produced, engineered, mixed, and performed all instrumentation on the track.

Background
The song's music video, directed by Mancy Gant, depicts Bundick and his band performing and hosting a dance party with artists from his Company Record Label studio, based in Oakland, California.

Reception
Ben Kaye at Consequence of Sound considered it Bundick's "most playful" single in some time, writing, "It's backloaded with grooving bongo rhythms and squinching synths giving the chorus and electronic slickness." Gabriela Tully Claymore, writing for Stereogum, perceived a "quiet desperation to the lyrics" of the tune, "made quieter by the fact that the instrumentation is so languid and easy-going."

Charts

Notes

References

2019 singles
2019 songs
Songs written by Toro y Moi
Toro y Moi songs